The 2017 LPGA Tour was a series of professional golf tournaments for elite female golfers from around the world. The season began in the Bahamas on January 26 and ended on November 19 at the Tiburón Golf Club in Naples, Florida. The tournaments are sanctioned by the United States-based Ladies Professional Golf Association (LPGA).

Schedule and results
The number in parentheses after each winners' name is the player's total number of wins in official money individual events on the LPGA Tour, including that event. Tournament and winner names in bold indicate LPGA majors.

Season leaders
Money list leaders

Full 2017 official money list

Scoring average leaders

Full 2017 scoring average list

Awards

See also
2017 Ladies European Tour
2017 Symetra Tour

Notes

References

External links
Official site

LPGA Tour seasons
LPGA Tour